Gastón Pinedo Zabala (born 18 February 1998) is an Argentine professional footballer who plays as a midfielder for Sacachispas.

Career
Pinedo started with Quilmes, signing in 2012. The club were relegated from the Primera División in 2016–17, with Pinedo not featuring at senior level though he was once an unused substitute for a fixture versus Estudiantes in June 2017. He returned to their reserves throughout 2017–18, prior to reappearing in their first-team in 2018–19. His professional debut arrived on 2 February 2019 as they drew at home to Temperley, participating for sixty-five minutes before being substituted for David Drocco. Pinedo, in February 2020, terminated his contract; subsequently joining Rosario Puerto Belgrano in Liga del Sur.

In July 2020, Pinedo penned a contract with Sacachispas of Primera B Metropolitana.

Career statistics
.

References

External links

1998 births
Living people
People from Quilmes
Argentine footballers
Association football midfielders
Primera Nacional players
Quilmes Atlético Club footballers
Sacachispas Fútbol Club players
Sportspeople from Buenos Aires Province